Hamer Hall is a multi-purpose arena located on the campus of Pennsylvania Western University California (known before July 2022 as California University of Pennsylvania) in California, Pennsylvania. The building is the home to California's athletic offices, varsity arena, natatorium, weight room, training room, classrooms and other facilities used by Vulcan student-athletes and the campus community. Hamer Hall's hardwood court is the current home of the California Vulcans men's and women's basketball and volleyball teams, while adjacent to the main arena, the first floor includes 10 locker rooms and the main athletic equipment room. Cal's six-lane, 25-yard competition pool, also used for classes and recreation, also has several locker rooms, new scoreboards and record boards, as well as the head coach's office and gallery seating for 250.  The second floor features the main athletic office and space for all the varsity programs. In addition, the University's sports management program office is located in Hamer Hall. 

In the past, the building was the default location for commencement ceremonies, however, Hamer Hall ceased to host most sporting events and commencement ceremonies when the Convocation Center opened in fall 2011, ending Hamer Hall's 46-year tenure as Cal U's home court. Hamer Hall opened in 1965 and was rededicated in 2000, with the renovation and construction of a new "Alumni Room".

References 
 Hamer Hall - California Vulcans
 Hamer Hall Rededication - California University of Pennsylvania

Indoor arenas in Pennsylvania
Sports venues in Pennsylvania
Buildings and structures in Washington County, Pennsylvania
California Vulcans
California University of Pennsylvania
Sports venues completed in 1965
University and college buildings completed in 1965
1965 establishments in Pennsylvania